Harry Millington (birth unknown – death unknown) was an English professional rugby league footballer who played in the 1920s, 1930s and 1940s.

Playing career

International honours
Harry Millington won a cap for England while at Widnes in 1944 against Wales.

County honours
Harry Millington played  in Lancashire's 7-5 victory over Australia in the 1937–38 Kangaroo tour of Great Britain and France match at Wilderspool Stadium, Warrington on Wednesday 29 September 1937, in front of a crowd of 16,250.

Challenge Cup Final appearances
Harry Millington played  in Widnes' 10-3 victory over St. Helens in the 1929–30 Challenge Cup Final during the 1929–30 season at Wembley Stadium, London on Saturday 3 May 1930 in front of a crowd of 36,544, played  in the 5-11 defeat by Hunslet in the 1933–34 Challenge Cup Final during the 1933–34 season at Wembley Stadium, London on Saturday 5 May 1934, and played  in the 18-5 victory over Keighley in the 1936–37 Challenge Cup Final at Wembley Stadium, London on Saturday 8 May 1937.

County Cup Final appearances
Harry Millington played  in Widnes' 7-3 victory over Wigan in the 1945–46 Lancashire County Cup Final during the 1945–46 season at Wilderspool Stadium, Warrington on Saturday 27 October 1945.

Honoured at Widnes
Harry Millington is a Widnes Hall Of Fame Inductee.

References

External links
Statistics at rugby.widnes.tv
Hall Of Fame at rugby.widnes.tv

England national rugby league team players
English rugby league players
Halifax R.L.F.C. players
Lancashire rugby league team players
Oldham R.L.F.C. players
Place of birth missing
Place of death missing
Rugby league locks
Rugby league second-rows
Widnes Vikings players
Year of birth missing
Year of death missing